Ullal railway station (Code:KZE) is a railway station serving the region of Ullal, Mangalore in the Dakshina Kannada District of Karnataka, India. It lies to the south of Mangalore city and in the Shoranur–Mangalore section of the Southern Railways. Trains halting at the station connect the region to prominent cities in India such as Thiruvananthapuram, Kochi, Chennai, Kollam, Bangalore, Kozhikode, Coimbatore, Mysore  and so forth.

See also
Mangalore Central railway station, Hampankatta, Mangalore
Mangalore Junction railway station, Kankanady, Mangalore
Surathkal railway station, Surathkal, Mangalore
Nethravathi railway station, Mangalore
Tokkottu railway station, Mangalore

References

Railway stations in Dakshina Kannada district
Palakkad railway division